Byszewo may refer to the following places:
Byszewo, Kuyavian-Pomeranian Voivodeship (north-central Poland)
Byszewo, Masovian Voivodeship (east-central Poland)
Byszewo, Kołobrzeg County in West Pomeranian Voivodeship (north-west Poland)
Byszewo, Łobez County in West Pomeranian Voivodeship (north-west Poland)